The 2009 JSM Challenger of Champaign–Urbana was a professional tennis tournament played on indoor hard courts. It was the eighth edition of the tournament which was part of the 2009 ATP Challenger Tour. It took place in Champaign, United States between 16 and 22 November 2009.

Singles main-draw entrants

Seeds

 Rankings are as of November 9, 2009.

Other entrants
The following players received wildcards into the singles main draw:
  Ruben Gonzales
  Nicholas Monroe
  Dennis Nevolo
  Blake Strode

The following players received entry from the qualifying draw:
  Ričardas Berankis
  Arnau Brugués Davi
  Kaden Hensel
  Björn Rehnquist
  Cecil Mamiit (LL)

Champions

Singles

 Michael Russell def.  Taylor Dent, 7–5, 6–4

Doubles

 Brian Battistone /  Dann Battistone def.  Treat Conrad Huey /  Harsh Mankad, 7–5, 7–6(5)

External links
Official website
ITF search 
2009 Draws

JSM Challenger of Champaign-Urbana
JSM Challenger of Champaign–Urbana
JSM Challenger of Champaign-Urbana
JSM Challenger of Champaign-Urbana
JSM Challenger of Champaign-Urbana